Nephrodesmus is a genus of flowering plants in the legume family, Fabaceae. It belongs to the subfamily Faboideae. It contains c. 5 species, all endemic to New Caledonia.  Its closest relatives is Arthroclianthus, also endemic to New Caledonia and their distinction has been challenged.

References 

Desmodieae
Endemic flora of New Caledonia
Fabaceae genera